, also known as Space Cop Gabin and Space Cop Gaban, is a Japanese Tokusatsu series produced by Toei Company that aired on TV Asahi from March 5, 1982 to February 25, 1983. The series launched the Metal Hero franchise and was the first installment in the Space Sheriff series.

Plot
Earth is invaded by the criminal organization known as Makuu, led by Don Horror, who had first destroyed a space colony near Earth. Don Horror wants to dominate the whole universe, and the Earth represents an obstacle that he has to overcome by turning it into a domain for all evil. Gavan is helped by Mimi, the daughter of Commander Qom, and is given information by Qom, assisted by Marin on his home planet. Gavan goes to Earth to defend it against Don Horror and his devilish schemes. He settles on Earth incognito as Retsu Ichijouji, taking a job at the Avalon Youth Club in Japan to track Makuu's forces down.

Characters

Dolgiran Crew
It is composed of the giant weaponed  and the mechanical dragon  that Gavan rides on in to destroy Makuu spacecraft. Dol's attacks include the  that breathes out fire from its mouth, the  that uses its front feet to clamp down pesky fighters, the  similar to Dol Kick but used by Gavan Type G, the  that fires laser beams from Dol's eyes and its claws, and the  that whips fighters attacking from behind with Dol's tail.

When needed, Gavan yells  so the Dolgiran can encase him in  particles that form into his silver chrome combat suit within 0.05 seconds. When no longer needing the armor, Gavan utters the Vacuum Evaporation command for his suit to be sent back to the Dolgiran. He is an accomplished athlete and has various weapons at his disposal. Though he relinquished his position as Earth's protector to his successors, marrying Mimi after Shaider's mission on Earth was completed, Gavan battled other enemies like the Madou, the Fuuma cult, and the Zangyack Empire. During the events of Space Sheriff Gavan: The Movie, Gavan selected Geki Jumonji to succeed him as the new Gavan. He is now promoted to commander status during the events of Kamen Rider × Super Sentai × Space Sheriff: Super Hero Taisen Z.
 (1-31 and 42-44)  She is the only daughter of Commander Qom, Shelly's cousin and Gavan's girlfriend when she stowed away on the Dolgiran. She uses a pendant which is also a visual illusion device allows her to use , she can transform into a budgerigar to spy on the Makuu. She is in love with Gavan but would support him in any case. She leaves the Dolgiran to help her mother on Planet Bird, to return in later battles to continue helping Gavan. After the fall of Makuu, Mimi became a teacher on Planet Bird before she was married to Gavan.

Arsenal
  Gavan's mighty sword which is at first normal, with a steel blade.
  Gavan's projectile attack. Originally a laser beam emitted from his right hand.
  A protective barrier that Gavan can emit to deflect any attack in front of him.
  A radar device that Gavan uses to detect invisible monsters.
  A sonar device which enables Gavan to detect any movement and sound in the area.
  Gavan's personal vehicle, which he uses to enter Makuu Space. When he calls for it, this red motorcycle with side car and flashing lights at the front comes from the Dolgiran to Gavan's current location. He occasionally uses it when fighting Makuu on Earth.
  Gavan's private tank, first used in episode 29. Like Dol, he stands up on the tank and commands it. This heavy vehicle is quite deadly thanks to all its lasers and cannons. Scooper is contained inside.
  Gavan's drill machine. He uses it to save Professor Kaminaga, to find hidden monsters, and to locate his father.

Allies
  He is the commander of Galactic Union Patrol and the father of Mimi. He lives on Planet Bird, helping Gavan by providing information and training needed to beat the Makuu. He and Gavan can communicate through a giant screen on the Dolgiran.
  She is Commander Qom's assistant. She was ready to save Gavan's life when he was almost killed by the poison of the Dokuja Monster. She became Gavan's second assistant in Mimi's absence.
  Gavan's father and the former Space Sheriff of Earth. Voice was betrayed by his partner Hunter Killer and handed over to Makuu so he would be forced to build the Hoshino Space Cannon, a weapon that can destroy a planet, but he kept the blueprints a secret even after being tortured. Though Voicer was saved from imprisonment by his son Gavan, he died soon after being brought to the Dolgiran with the secret blueprint for the cannon written on the palm of his hand.
He came to earth in search of a kidnapped princess from Planet Beeze.
 (42-44)  He is a forest patrolman descended from the Iga ninja clan who was nearly killed by Buffalo Doubler. Den is sent to Planet Bird for his injuries, eventually returning to Earth take over Gavan's position in protecting the planet as Space Sheriff Sharivan.
  She is Gavan's adopted sister and was brought up by Voicer when her parents were killed by Hunter Killer. She is a very sweet girl who assists Gavan in his missions.
  His is a photographer whose obsession is UFOs; he created a machine that is able to detect them. He met Gavan and from then on, the two keep crossing each other's paths. He occasionally works at the Avalon Riding Club to replace Retsu. He also befriends Wakaba and Yoichi.
  The kind grandfather and owner of the  whose greatest wish is to get his young body back. Though he feels sympathy towards Gavan (who he knows as Retsu), he is often angered about his frequent disappearances.
 and   Gosuke's grandchildren. They both live at the Avalon Riding Club and they sometimes happen to be in the middle of the Makuu schemes. They have developed a strong friendship with Retsu and Kojiro.
  A youth who works for the Avalon Riding Club.

Space Crime Organization Makuu
The , led by Don Horror, commit criminal activities throughout the galaxies before targeting Earth for its resources. After Don Horror's death, much of Makuu Castle was destroyed yet ended up in the void of space where it was found by Brighton, Toya Okuma, during the events of Space Sheriff Gavan: The Movie where he revived the Makuu Syndicate to resurrect Don Horror. But with the ceremony stopped, Makuu Castle was completely destroyed as a result.

  The monstrous leader of Makuu, an immobile six-armed idol-like being who aims to turn Earth, the obstacle that prevents his conquest of the universe, into a haven for evil by any means. During their final battle, after being severed from his body, Don Horror is killed by Gavan in their final duel. However, during the events of Space Sheriff Gavan: The Movie, Don Horror attempted to resurrect himself by using his agent Brighton to get him a vessel to house his spirit. But Don Horror's revival in the body of a young woman named  Itsuki Kawai was stopped by Gavan Type-G.
  Don Horror's secretary, almost never speaking yet always laughing. She operates the Dimensional Conversion Switch that allows a portal to Makuu Space to manifest.
 (1-30 and 42)  He was Voicer's partner, but betrayed him to join Makuu as Don Horror's right-hand man. But after being replaced by San Dorva, Hunter Killer reappears to help Gavan to find his father just before dying to redeem himself.
 (30-44)  The son of Don Horror, wearing crimson armor and holding a trident containing the brain of his mother, Witch Kiba, San Dorva joined Makuu alongside his mother Kiba and took Hunter Killer's place as Don Horror's right hand. He meets his end fighting Gavan in the final battle.
 (30-44)  San Dorva's mother, her mind transferred into his scepter, the elderly hag was a wife of Don Horror despite him displaying nothing but contempt for her. She co-plots a devilish scheme to exterminate Gavan. She can materialize at any moment. She is killed by Gavan along with San Dorva.
 (1-13)  They are the generals of Makuu who can have a human form with the help of the Modification Room and are aided by the BEM Monsters.
  The foot soldiers of Makuu in black leather and tights. They are unlimited in number and act only when in groups.

BEM Monsters
 are animal-themed monsters sent by Don Horror to thwart Gavan.
   This monster appeared in episode 1. Its powers include fast crawling, invisibility, red lasers from the red back spots, mouth homing mines, and burrowing. A Doubleman summons this monster to assist in Makuu's operation to invade Earth. They begin attacking a space colony while the Shako Monster attacks from the inside until they destroy it. After Gavan saves a group of kids from being killed by a Doubleman who caught them playing around in one of their bases, he fights them and the Shako Monster. Don Horror has his minions activate the Makuu Space where the Shako Monster will be more powerful. But Gavan is able to kill it with Gavan Dynamic.
   This monster appeared in episode 2. Its powers include explosive mouth lasers, rolling into a ball, mouth mist capable of propulsion, invisibility, and size growth. Makuu has stolen some oil tanker ships threatening to use them to destroy Japan unless the government gives into their demands. After Gavan foils their attempt to get Mt. Fuji, they decide to use the oil tanker ships to destroy Japan. Gavan finds and infiltrates one of their bases where he goes into some boobytraps and running into Gamara Monster. After Gavan kills the Gamara Monster with the Dol Laser, he foils Makuu's plan by stopping the oil tankers from destroying Japan.
   This monster appeared in episode 3. Its powers include a whip, eye beams, body part separation, an electric remote trident that can fire explosive electric blasts, and invisibility. Condor assists Makuu in their scheme to have Professor Black Star capture animals and children in nets to be used as test subjects for a teleportation device which will send them to different locations. 
   This monster appeared in episode 4. Its powers include a mouth stinger that dissolves victims, fast burrowing, a double sided triangular dagger, explosive eye energy bolts, telekinesis, and invisibility. Makuu uses the Sasori Monster with a Doubleman disguised as Professor Kaminaga in order for Makuu to get their hands on the Demon Helm.
   This monster appeared in episode 5. Its powers include toxic fangs, an extendable electric tentacle for the right hand, invisibility, summoning cobras, speed, and explosive mouth energy bolts. While Gavan makes his way into a Makuu base, Hunter Killer shoots Gavan with a bullet laced with poison from the Dokuja Monster.
   This monster appeared in episode 6. Its powers include tentacle ropes with energy pulses, a flying white ball form, eye energy bolts, teleportation, and size growth. The Oomadako Monster is part of Makuu's plan to feed children mutagen spiked food to turn them into Doublemen that will serve Makuu.
   This monster appeared in episode 7. Its powers include teleportation, size changing, explosive body energy bolts, summoning roses armed with venom spray, invisibility, and mouth venom spray. The Samurai Ari Monster aids Makuu in their plans to steal gold even using one of Gavan's child friends to do it with the cost of the child's life should the child refuse.
   This monster appeared in episode 8. Its powers include mouth flames, agility, and teleportation. The Kaenzaru Monster assists Makuu in their plan to create Space Magazine that will cause propaganda to turn people against Gavan.
   This monster appeared in episode 10. Its powers include teleportation, gliding, blinding mouth powder spray, size growth, and eye lasers. The Nijichou Monster aids Makuu's plan in turning athletes into mindless soldiers to make an army strong enough to defeat Gavan.
   This monster appeared in episode 11. Its powers include a high resistance to heat, explosive flashes from the eye, teleportation, and size growth. The Armadillo Monster accompanies Makuu to kill Gavan after they used Gavan's search for his father to lure him into a trap.
   This monster appeared in episode 12. Its powers include teleportation, explosive mouth foam, and agility. Makuu has discovered a boy when he overhears their plan, threatening to have the Goat Monster kill him unless he keeps his mouth shut.
   This monster appeared in episode 13. Its only known power is a set of horns on the head. The Sai Monster is merged with a Doubleman to create Sai Doubler.

Double Monsters
 are a second series of monsters created by Don Horror, combining the traits of Doublemen and BEM Monsters. During a fight with Gavan, a Double Monster retreats into the Makuu Space where it becomes three times more powerful in an attempt to get the upper hand against Gavan.
 Sai Doubler  This monster appeared in episodes 13 and 14. Its powers include a set of horns on the head, strength, a sword, a shield, teleportation, and a human disguise. The Sai Doubler aids in Makuu's plan to kill Gavan but is killed by Gavan using Gavan Dynamic.
 Shamo Doubler  This monster appeared in episode 15. Its powers include teleportation, agility, summoning poles, summoning defeated BEM Monsters, and a sword. The Shamo Doubler aids in Makuu's plan to sacrifice Gavan in order to celebrate the anniversary of their creation of Makuu city.
 Kama Doubler  This monster appeared in episode 16. Its powers include a human disguise, a chained scythe that can be controlled mentally, fake deaths, telekinesis, and a sword. The Kama Doubler assists Makuu in their plans to capture an alien boy in order to get their hands on a device.
 Hyou Doubler  This monster appears in episode 17. Its powers include a human disguise, high jumping, and a double sided bear trap staff. When Mimi falls in love with a young police officer, Makuu along with the Hyou Doubler capture the officer so Gavan must race to save him or he will be blown to smithereens.
 Aogame Doubler  This monster appeared in episode 18. Its powers include a human disguise, swimming, a halberd that emits electric surges, launch-able shell plates, an explosive boomerang, and a hypnotic hermit crab shell. The Aogame Doubler aids in Makuu’s scheme to steal the time machine so they can steal riches from a palace.
 Kyoryu Doubler  This monster appeared in episode 19. Its powers include a human disguise, a double sided blade, three explosive spears on the back, a pistol, high jumping, and a sword. The Kyoryu Doubler is responsible for damaging Gavan’s power source for his armor so Gavan has to get it repaired before the Makuu and the Kyoryu Doubler kill him.
 Kera Doubler  This monster appeared in episode 20. Its powers include a human disguise, a spiked left arm, teleportation by spinning, three grenade launchers in the torso, a cannon in the left shoulder, and a sword. The Kera Doubler is part of Makuu’s plan to obtain the poisonous stone for their plans.
 Mitsubachi Doubler  This monster appeared in episode 21. Its powers include a human disguise, pain negating venom and explosive tracking needles from the left hand stinger called the Bee Sting, a whip, and size growth. The Mitsubachi Doubler disguises herself as a doctor to brainwash people into mindless soldiers to serve Makuu.
 Kurage Doubler  This monster appeared in episode 22. Its powers include a human disguise, a double sided club ended trident capable of levitation, high jumping, and a sword. The Kurage Doubler and his Makuu allies assist Thief X to commit robberies and kill Gavan.
 Kumo Doubler  This monster appeared in episode 23. Its powers include a human disguise, spiders that emit explosive eye flashes, an electric cane, hand webs, teleportation, and a sword. He disguises himself as a man to kidnap women at night bringing them to Makuu to use in their plans. 
 Saber Doubler  This monster appeared in episode 24. Its powers include high jumping, a pair of claws on the left wrist, illusions, grenades, a sword, and size growth. When Mimi has a nightmare of Gavan being killed by the Saber Doubler, he comes out of Mimi’s dream to kill Gavan.
 Goshiki Doubler  This monster appeared in episode 25. Its powers include a human disguise, hallucinating white mist from the right shoulder, teleportation, high jumping, a mentally controlled spear that can emit electric streams on the ground, levitation, size growth, and left wrist grenades. The Goshiki Doubler disguises herself as a woman who gives girls perfume that turns girls into monsters so Makuu will have an army of monsters.
 Gas Doubler  This monster appeared in episode 26. Its powers include a human disguise, summoning white hallucination gas, a pincer claw staff that can emit explosions, teleportation, and a pair of swords. The Gas Doubler poses as the leader of a terrorist group called Dream Bird to attack people.
 Jaaku Doubler  This monster appeared in episode 27. Its powers include a human disguise, telekinesis, mind control, a serpent staff, summoning snakes that can turn into explosive beads, high jumping, and a sword. The Jaaku Doubler disguises himself as a faculty member to turn school students as well as teachers evil. 
 Hakkotsu Doubler  This monster appeared in episode 28. Its powers include illusions, a bone staff, telekinetic bone bombs, high jumping, teleportation, levitation, and a sword. The Hakkotsu Doubler aids a female assassin named Monica to kill Gavan. 
 Magic Doubler  This monster appeared in episode 29. Its powers include mentally controlling doves, razor cards, telepathic explosions, teleportation, a telekinetic cloak, red electric shocks from the palms that can be used as surges on the ground, a flying circular saw, transforming into a rock capable of turning invisible, and a pair of swords. The Magic Doubler disguises himself as a magician in a Makuu scheme to steal all money and jewelry using a magician trick called a warp trick. 
 Keibi Doubler  This monster appeared in episode 30. Its powers include high jumping, morphing into a levitating ball, bouncing head bombs, regeneration, a pair of magnetic spheres, a kanabo, and a sword. The Keiki Doubler is created to aid Don Horror’s son Son Dorva in killing Gavan. 
 Saimin Doubler  This monster appeared in episode 31. Its powers include a human disguise with palm lasers, turning humans into puppets by hypnosis, a staff that can fire lasers, teleportation, summoning a rock bomb, invisibility, and a sword. The Saimin Doubler aids Makuu to go after a princess from Planet Beeze which was about to become a Makuu colony.
 Totsugeki Doubler  This monster appeared in episode 32. Its powers include teleportation, a nasal horn, an electric lance, telekinesis, and a sword. The Totsugeki Doubler is created to assist Witch Kiba and Son Dorva to kill Gavan.
 Kaibutsu Doubler  This monster appeared in episode 33. Its powers include rapid size growth, flight in the larval state, invisibility, an electric claw staff that emits electric surges, teleportation, high jumping, and a sword. The Kaibutsu Doubler aids in Makuu’s scheme to create special Double Monsters that will turn into giants. 
 Doctor Doubler  This monster appeared in episode 34. Its powers include a human disguise, teleportation, launchable arm spears, a zanbato, and a sword. The Doctor Doubler is created as part of Makuu’s plan to control peoples memories using a terrible device.
 Guts Doubler  This monster appeared in episode 35. Its powers include am electric horned club that emits spiral electric surges, high jumping, a round shield, and a sword. The Guts Doubler is created to aid Witch Kiba and Son Dorva in capturing Marin and Tsuchiko so that Gavan will be at their mercy.
 Urami Doubler  This monster appeared in episode 36. Its powers include high jumping, an electric staff, freezing stare, teleportation, a human disguise, voodoo pictures, illusions, and a sword. The Urami Doubler is used in a Makuu plot to kill Gavan by creating a movie about him. What is bad about this is that if Gavan in the movie suffers damage so does the real Gavan. 
 Anahori Doubler  This monster appeared in episode 37. Its powers include a human disguise, teleportation, burrowing, a pair of bat bombs, a club, a wine-like whip, an electric drill that can be worn on the right hand and turn into a sword, and illusions. The Anahori Doubler and his Makuu allies take control of a church where they plan to steal its treasure.
 Gang Doubler  This monster appeared in episode 38. Its powers include telepathic explosions, summoning explosive magnets, high jumping, teleportation, and a sword. Makuu plans to get their hands on a sword with hidden powers. Unfortunately for them, Gavan fights them and steals the sword. Son Dorva has Kiba take a bus full of children hostage to trade for the sword. 
 Nottori Doubler  This monster appeared in episode 39. Its powers include a human disguise, a sniper rifle-like heat gun, high jumping, mentally controlling an electric tomahawk and a gatling gun, invisibility, and a sword. He and his Makuu allies take control of a poor family’s home as a hideout where they plan to snipe Gavan. 
 Yokai Doubler  This monster appeared in episode 40. Its powers include a human disguise, telekinesis, a double clawed staff that can emit electric surges, telepathic explosions, teleportation, high jumping, right palm webs, summoning skulls, invisibility, and a sword. The Yokai Doubler aids Makuu in their scheme to mine minerals from a mountain to make atomic bombs. 
 Jigoku Doubler  This monster appeared in episode 41. Its powers include a spear that emits explosions on contact, dividing into four ninjas, teleportation, emitting electric surges, a ball form, high jumping, and an electric sword. The Jigoku Doubler and Makuu trap Gavan in the Makuu Space where he is forced to run a marathon of death. To make matters worse a magic hourglass threaten to seal Gavan forever in Makuu Space.
 Buffalo Doubler  This monster appeared in episode 42. Its powers include a pair of forehead mandibles that emit electric surges, summoning giant buffalo horns, telepathic explosions, teleportation, a ball form, and a sword. The Buffalo Doubler aids Makuu in their plan to terrorize forests and kill Gavan. 
 Lizard Doubler  This monster was used by the revived Makuu during the events of Space Sheriff Gavan: The Movie and was destroyed by Gavan. Its powers include skin capable of hacking, activating the axis shift device mentally, a sword, a shield, a missile launcher that can be attached to the right arm called the Lizard Missile, and manipulating environments.
 Rhino Doubler  This monster is a remake of the Sai Doubler, who later appears in Tokumei Sentai Go-Busters 31st and 32nd episodes, which serve as a team-up with Gavan Type-G.

Episode list

Films

Gokaiger vs. Gavan

 is a film featuring the clash of Gavan and the space pirates Kaizoku Sentai Gokaiger and especially their captain Marvelous, who was connected to Gavan since his childhood. Released on January 21, 2012, the film commemorates the 30th anniversary of Gavan and is part of the 35th anniversary of the Super Sentai Series. Kenji Ohba not only portrays Retsu Ichijouji, but also reprises his roles from Battle Fever J and Denshi Sentai Denziman. Even a copy of Gavan´s combat suit appears named Gavan Bootleg.

Gavan the Movie

 is a 2012 Japanese tokusatsu film to commemorate the 30th Anniversary of the Metal Hero Series. The movie features Retsu training his replacement Geki Jumonji as the youth confronts the revived Space Mafia Makuu.

Super Hero Taisen Z

 is the 2013 film featuring the first crossover between characters of Toei's three main Tokusatsu franchises, Kamen Rider, Super Sentai, and the Space Sheriff Series representing the Metal Heroes series as a whole. The protagonists of Space Sheriff Gavan: The Movie, Tokumei Sentai Go-Busters, and Kaizoku Sentai Gokaiger are featured, but the casts of Kamen Rider Wizard, Zyuden Sentai Kyoryuger, and Kamen Rider Fourze also participate in the film. The Space Ironmen Kyodain from Kamen Rider Fourze the Movie: Space, Here We Come! also make an appearance. The teaser for the film was shown after Kamen Rider × Kamen Rider Wizard & Fourze: Movie War Ultimatum.

Space Squad: Gavan vs. Dekaranger

Cast
 Gavan/Retsu Ichijouji  Kenji Ohba
 Mimi  Wakiko Kano
 Qom  Toshiaki Nishizawa
 Marin  Kyoko Nashiro
 Voicer  Sonny Chiba
 Kojiro Oyama  Masayuki Suzuki
 Tamiko Ichijouji  Tamie Kubata
 Tsukiko Hoshino  Aiko Tachibana
 Makuu  Morita Sakamoto
 Gosuke Fuji  Jun Tatara
 Yoichi Fuji  Susumu Fujiwara
 Wakaba Fuji  Sanae Nakajima 
 Shigeru Touyama  Shinichi Kase
 Hunter Killer  Michiro Iida
 San Dorva  Ken Nishida
 Kiba  Noboru Mitani
 Double Girls  Mariko Azuma, Rie Hirase, Hiromi Yamaguchi
 Narrator  Issei Masamune

Voice actors
 Don Horror  Shōzō Iizuka (Episodes 1-10)  Takeshi Watabe (Episodes 11-44) 
 Horror Girl  Kotoe Taichi

Guest stars
 Doubleman (human form)  Satoshi Kurihara (Episode 2)
 Doubleman (human form)  Masashi Ishibashi (Episode 3)
 Professor Kaminaga  Hiroshi Unayama (Episode 4)
 Doubleman (human form)  Shun Ueda (Episode 6)
 Samurai Ari Monster (human form)  Susumu Kurobe (Episode 7)
 Editor-in-Chief Arashiyama (Double Man's human form)  Rikiya Iwaki (Episode 8)
 Tetsuya Sugimoto/Tetsu Tsukahara  Dai Nagaswa (Episode 9)
 Nanae Tsukahara  Akiko Ishii (Episode 9)
 Toshi Kojima  Kazuo Arai (Episode 10)
 Doctor Hoshino  Eiji Karasawa (Episode 11)
 Hayashima  Masaharu Saito (Episode 12)
 Goh Daijoji/Hyou Doubler  Shinji Todo (Episode 17)
 Honey Manda/Mitsubachi Doubler  Machiko Soga (Episode 21)
 Monica (younger)  Hitomi Yoshioka (Episode 28)
 Paul  Hirohisa Nakata (Episode 29)
 Alan  Hiroshi Miyauchi (Episodes 30 and 31)
 Double Monster  Hideyo Amamoto (Episode 37)
 Policeman  Touta Tarumi (Episode 38)
 Den Iga  Hiroshi Watari (Episodes 42 and 44)

Stunts
 Gavan  Jun Murakami  Hitoshi Yamaguchi
 Horror Girl  Miyuki Nagato

Song
Opening theme

Lyrics  
Composition  
Arrangement  
Artist  Akira Kushida
Ending theme

Lyrics  Keisuke Yamakawa
Composition  Michiaki Watanabe
Arrangement  Kōji Makaino
Artist  Akira Kushida

In other countries
Space Sheriff Gavan was released in the Philippines which aired on RPN from 1985 to 1986 and on ABC (now TV5) as Sky Ranger Gabin from 1994 to 1997. Sky Ranger Gabin was then later re-aired from 1997 to 1998 on RPN before Choujin Sentai Jetman's airtime and was the 2nd Metal Hero shown on that station from 1999 to 2000. The re-run was then aired again on ABC. Every weeknights, Space Sheriff Shaider who's successor to Gabin, was aired in that country after to the release of Sky Ranger Gabin.
The series was aired in France under the title X-OR on TF1. Its popularity led to the airings of subsequent Metal Hero shows such as Space Sheriff Sharivan and Jikuu Senshi Spielban.
Indonesia and Malaysia's screening of Gavan (translated as Gaban) on local TV has gained itself a cult following, and the word Gaban itself has become a meme. It is used after adjectives to give an image of bravery e.g. "sebesar Gaban" ("as big as Gaban", epically big) or "Gaban Betul" ("truly Gaban", really brave) or "tahap Gaban" stand for the superior level of achievement.
In Brazil, where the series was broadcast on Rede Globo, the series was very popular in the 1980s and 1990s, along with several seasons of Metal Hero franchise.
The character appeared in Power Rangers Beast Morphers by way of footage from Tokumei Sentai Go-Busters, but with a new backstory under the name Captain Chaku.
The series was licensed by Discotek Media for an American Blu-ray release, its first English-subtitled release. It was released in October 2022.

References

External links
 
 Discotek Media's Official Space Sheriff Gavan website

Metal Hero Series
Discotek Media
Toei tokusatsu
Western (genre) peace officers
1982 Japanese television series debuts
1983 Japanese television series endings
Space adventure television series
Space Western television series
TV Asahi original programming